The 1928 Loyola Ramblers football team was an American football team that represented Loyola University Chicago as an independent during the 1928 college football season, and the Ramblers finished with a 4–4 record. In his sixth season as head coach, Roger Kiley resigned following their second game to return to a private law practice. Assistant coach Dan Lamont was appointed as head coach for the remainder of the season, and in December was retained as the full time head coach at Loyola.

Schedule

References

Loyola
Loyola Ramblers football seasons
Loyola Ramblers football